Life Begins Tomorrow is a 1933 German drama film directed by Werner Hochbaum and starring Erich Haußmann, Hilde von Stolz and Harry Frank.

After working on the film, the left-wing Hochbaum emigrated to Austria due to the coming to power of the Nazis, although he did return to make films for the regime.

The film's sets were designed by Gustav A. Knauer and Alexander Mügge.

Plot
A cafe violinist is released from prison. Through his neighbors' whispered gossip, and the violinist's own flashbacks, it is learned he was imprisoned for murder. Threaded with all this is another uncertainty: Has his wife, a waitress, begun a love affair while he was in jail? And will this give the violinist another temptation to murder?

Artistic devices

Cast

References

Bibliography

External links 
 

1933 films
1933 drama films
Films of Nazi Germany
German drama films
1930s German-language films
Films directed by Werner Hochbaum
German black-and-white films
1930s German films